Gregory Lee Horne (born November 22, 1964) is a former professional American football punter in the National Football League (NFL). He played college football at the University of Arkansas.

Horne was a punter for two seasons in the NFL, first with the Cincinnati Bengals (1987) and with the Cardinals in St. Louis (1987) and then in Phoenix (1988). His career punting average was 40.6 yards in 122 punts.

He was the London Monarchs' punter in 1991, winning the first World Bowl. He played for Montreal Machine in 1992.

Horne led the NCAA in punting in 1986 averaging 47.2 yards per punt for Arkansas Razorbacks. He was the Razorbacks Punter in 1983–1986 and kicker 1983–1985. For his college career he punted 180 times for a 44.4 yard average. He still holds the Southwest Conference and Arkansas school record for highest punting average in a season(47.2 in 1986)

References

1964 births
Living people
People from Russellville, Arkansas
Players of American football from Arkansas
American football punters
Arkansas Razorbacks football players
Cincinnati Bengals players
St. Louis Cardinals (football) players
Phoenix Cardinals players
London Monarchs players
Montreal Machine players
People from Pope County, Arkansas